Mamadou Kané (footballer, born 1997), Guinean footballer
Mamadou Kane (soccer, born 2003), Canadian soccer player